Ankleshwar Udyognagar railway station is a small railway station in Bharuch district, Gujarat. Its code is AKVU. It serves Ankleshwar town. The station consists of 1 platforms. The platform is not well sheltered. It lacks many facilities including water and sanitation.

Trains 

 Ankleshwar–Rajpipla Passenger

References 

Transport in Ankleshwar
Vadodara railway division
Railway stations in Bharuch district